The 2019 Michelin GT Challenge at VIR was a sports car race sanctioned by the International Motor Sports Association (IMSA). The race was held at Virginia International Raceway in Alton, Virginia on August 25, 2019. The race was the tenth round of the 2019 IMSA SportsCar Championship, and the sixth round of the WeatherTech Sprint Cup. Nick Tandy and Patrick Pilet won the race overall in the #911 Porsche GT Team Porsche 911 RSR leading home a 1-2 for Porsche who clinched the GTLM manufactures championship. In GTD, the #33 Mercedes-AMG Team Riley Motorsports of Ben Keating and Jeroen Bleekemolen took their first win of the season.

Background 
This race was the second of two GT-only races on the 2019 IMSA Calendar, in which the prototype classes, Daytona Prototype international (DPi) and Le Mans Prototype 2 (LMP2), would not be taking part. 

On August 15th, 2019, IMSA released a technical bulletin regarding the Balance of Performance for the race. In GT Le Mans, The Ford GT received a 5 kilogram weight increase, and gained 10 horsepower. The BMW M8 GTE received a 6.5 horsepower reduction and fuel capacity reduction of 1 liter. In GTD, the Audi R8 LMS GT3 Evo and Ferrari 488 GT3 were given weight reductions of 20 and 10 kilograms respectively, while the McLaren 720S GT3 got a fuel capacity reduction of 4 liters.

Entries 

On August 14th, 2019, the entry list for the event was released, featuring 22 cars. 8 cars were entered in GTLM, and 14 in GTD. Scott Hargrove returned to Pfaff Motorsports after Dennis Olsen and Matt Campbell filled in the previous two rounds. Due to a scheduling conflict for Christina Nielsen, who was at Suzuka International Racing Course for the Suzuka 10 Hours, was replaced by Alice Powell. Starworks Motorsport withdrew from the event following continued performance issues with its Audi R8 after competing at Road America.

Qualifying 
Laurens Vanthoor took overall pole for the event, while Zacharie Robichon was quickest in GTD.

Qualifying results 

Results 

References

External links 

Michelin GT Challenge at VIR
2019 in sports in Virginia
Michelin GT Challenge at VIR